Jean Laurent or, in Spanish, Juan Laurent Minier; sometimes simply J. Laurent (23 July 1816, Garchizy – 24 November 1886, Madrid) was a French photographer who mostly worked in Spain.

Biography 
He first moved to Spain in 1843, and settled in Madrid. Until 1855, he worked as a box and paper maker, creating luxurious boxes for pastries and marbled paper for book bindings. That year, he became interested in photography from having done work coloring photographs. The following year, he was able to open a studio on the Carrera de San Jerónimo, near the Congress of Deputies, the same location where the British photographer, Charles Clifford, had set up his first studio.

In 1866, together with the Spanish photographer , he patented  which produced positives, rather than the negatives produced by the albumen print process. The paper enjoyed some popularity in Spain and France, but was never widely used.

He could boast of the title "Fotógrafo de Su Majestad la Reina" (The Queen's Photographer) from 1861 to 1868. That same year, he opened a store in Paris, devoted exclusively to selling his photographs of Spain and Portugal. One unusual product produced by his company were fans printed with photographs (especially bullfighting scenes) that would unfold like a mosaic. 

In 1874, he was commissioned by Baron Émile d’Erlanger to take photographs of the Black Paintings by Francisco de Goya at the Quinta del Sordo. The photographs were later used as a guide by the artist, Salvador Martínez Cubells, to remove the paintings and restore them for public display. This led to Laurent becoming the official photographer for the Museo del Prado, in 1879.

Laurent's son-in-law, Alfonso Roswag Nogier (1833–1900), became his principal partner and carried on the firm's business after Laurent's retirement in 1881. He was buried at Cementerio de la Almudena. After his death, the archive was acquired by the French photographer Joseph Jean Marie Lacoste Borde (1872-c.1930). When he was called to serve in the war in 1915, the collection was purchased by Joana Roig Villalonga (1877–1941), a Mallorcan, who continued to issue images under the name "Casa Laurent" until the archive was bought again, this time by another photographer, in 1930.

After his death in 1975, the collection was acquired by the Spanish government. The "Instituto del Patrimonio Cultural de España" has archived over 12,000 images created by Laurent and his company. The National Gallery of Art, Washington D.C. houses a collection of nearly 700 albumen prints made from Jean Laurent's photographs, many of which have been digitized.

Gallery of images

References

Exhibition Catalogues
 Las fotografías valencianas de J. Laurent, Valencia, Ayuntamiento de Valencia, 2003. 
 Jean Laurent en el Museo Municipal de Madrid. Retratos. Artistas plásticos, cat. Purificación Nájera Colino, Madrid, Museo Municipal de Madrid, 2005. Tomo I. . 
 La Casa Laurent y Guadalajara. Fotografías, 1862–1902, Guadalajara, Diputación Provincial, 2007. 
 La Andalucía del siglo XIX en las fotografías de J. Laurent y Cía., Almería, Junta de Andalucía, 1999. 
 Un fotógrafo francés en la España del siglo XIX: J. Laurent: Un photographe français dans l'Espagne du XIXème siècle, Madrid, Ministerio de Educación y Cultura, Caja de Madrid, 1996. 
 J. Laurent y Cía en Aragón. Fotografías, 1861–1877, Zaragoza, Diputación Provincial de Zaragoza, 1997. 
 Obras Públicas de España. Fotografías de J. Laurent, 1858–1870, Ciudad Real, Universidad de Castilla-La Mancha, 2003.

Collections 

 The Solemnity of Shadows: Juan Laurent’s Vision of Spain Honoring Juan Laurent on His 200th Birthday (2016)
 Laurent & Co. a history @ the Museo del Prado
 Works by Laurent @ the Institut Nationale d'Histoire de l'Art. (INHA)
 Works by Laurent @ the Biblioteca Digital Hispánica
 Works by Laurent @ the Instituto del Patrimonio Cultural de España (IPCE) 
 Toledo en las Fotografías de J.Laurent by Carlos Magariños Laguía (Masters Thesis)
 Álbum de Toledo (1865), Archivo Municipal

1816 births
1886 deaths
Spanish photographers
French emigrants to Spain
People from Nièvre
French photographers
Landscape photographers